Samuel Sutton Rawlinson (1809 – 18 July 1880) was an architect and engineer known for his work in Nottingham.

Life

He was born in Wallingford, Berkshire in 1809, son of George Rawlinson. In 1827 he was living in Bridgwater, Somerset as an articled clerk to Richard Carver. His father was also in Bridgwater as a lace manufacturer.

In 1853 he was on the board of the Scottish Widows' Fund Life Assurance Society, and  later he worked as a dealer in lace and silk in Clapham.

He was clearly successful in business as his estate was valued at £60,000 on his death on 18 July 1880. 

A stained glass window was inserted in St Peter's Church, Streatham, in memory of him and his wife Ann, in 1882, by their children.

Buildings and works

Nottingham General Cemetery 1836 
Canning Terrace Nottingham 1837–1840
Broad Street Wesleyan Church 1839

References

19th-century English architects
1809 births
1880 deaths
People from Wallingford, Oxfordshire
Architects from Nottingham